David Donato (born 7 September 1970) is a former Australian rules footballer who played with Fitzroy in the Australian Football League (AFL).

Donato was taken at pick three in the 1990 AFL Draft, behind Stephen Hooper and fellow Tasmanian James Cook. Like them, Donato had only a brief league career, with all his games coming in the second half of the 1991 season, from which he averaged 12 disposals.

He finished his football career back at his original club, Clarence.

References

1970 births
Australian rules footballers from Tasmania
Fitzroy Football Club players
Clarence Football Club players
Living people